Elasmobranch cestodes are parasitic tapeworms (class Cestoda), which infect elasmobranchs (sharks, rays and skates). While elasmobranchs are the definitive hosts, other organisms may be infected in earlier stages of the life cycle of these cestodes.

In 2010, there was a discovery of two species that belong to this group of tapeworms to have infected bivalve mollusks in South Carolina. Lab samples were taken from this event in 200 clams which were measured and necropsied. Following the test, two species of tapeworm plerocercoids (Duplicibothrium spp) and merocercoids (Rhodobothrium spp) were observed. The plerocercoids occupied the digestive gland ducts and merocercoids were found beneath the mantle of the Molinia lateralis, the clams from S. Carolina.

Sources
de Buron, Isaure. Roth, B. Patricia. Bergquist, C. Derk. Knott, M. David. Mulina Lateralis (Mollusca: Bivalvia) die-off in South Carolina: Discovery of a vector for two Elasmobranch Cestode species. J. Parasitol., 99(1), 2013, pp. 51–55. American Society of Parasitologists 2013.

References

Cestoda